Sugarshit Sharp is the fourth EP by the American noise rock band Pussy Galore, released in October 31, 1988 by Caroline Records.

Track listing

Accolades

Personnel
Adapted from the Sugarshit Sharp liner notes.

Pussy Galore
 Bob Bert – drums, percussion
 Julie Cafritz – electric guitar, vocals
 Jon Spencer – lead vocals, electric guitar
 Kurt Wolf – electric guitar

Production and additional personnel
 Chris Gehringer – mastering
 Pussy Galore – production
 Michael Lavine – photography

Charts

Release history

References

External links 
 

1988 EPs
Pussy Galore (band) albums
Caroline Records EPs
Matador Records EPs
Mute Records EPs